Mourners of Zion (Heb. Avelei Tziyon) is a term used to refer to a number of Jewish groups through the ages.

The Karaite subsect founded by Daniel al-Kumisi in the late ninth century CE .
A later Karaite community living in Constantinople in the late Middle Ages. They may have been exiles who left Jerusalem during the Crusades.
A Jewish group living in the mountains of Yemen, as described by Benjamin of Tudela. They fasted during the week and lived in caves.

Additionally, this term is vital in a phrase used in the Jewish mourning ritual. In mainstream (Ashkenazi) Judaism, mourners 
are offered the condolence "הַמָּקוֹם יְנַחֵם אֶתְכֶם בְּתוֹךְ שְׁאָר אֲבֵלֵי צִיּוֹן וִירוּשָׁלָיִם", "May The Omnipresent (One) comfort you among the remnant mourners of Zion and Jerusalem" 
throughout the period of Shiva.

See also
 Zion and Jerusalem in Jewish prayer and ritual

Karaite Judaism